Sara Lobo Brites is a Timor L'Estian politician. She was Deputy Minister of Finance in the VIII Constitutional Government of East Timor. She had earlier been a vice-governor of the Central Bank of Timor L'Este for five years.

References

Year of birth missing (living people)
Living people
Women government ministers of East Timor
Finance ministers of East Timor